Emile La Sére (1802 – August 14, 1882) was a member of the U. S. House of Representatives representing the first district in the state of Louisiana.  He served three terms as a Democrat.

Le Sére was born on Santo Domingo. He served as a major in the Civil War as was later quartermaster of the Trans-Mississippi Department.  He died in New Orleans.

References 
Biography at Congress.gov

1802 births
1882 deaths
Haitian emigrants to the United States
Confederate States Army officers
People of Louisiana in the American Civil War
Democratic Party members of the United States House of Representatives from Louisiana
19th-century American politicians